Baltic nuclear power plant may refer to:

Ignalina Nuclear Power Plant, a shuttered power plant in Lithuania
Visaginas Nuclear Power Plant, a planned power plant in Lithuania
Kaliningrad Nuclear Power Plant, under construction in Russia